Eero Raaste (born 23 April 1954) is a Finnish chess International Master (IM) (1987), four-times Finnish Chess Championship medalist (1976, 1980, 1983, 1986).

Biography
From the early 1970s to the late 1980s Eero Raaste was one of the leading Finnish chess players. He has won four medals at the Finnish Chess Championships: two silver (1980, 1986) and two bronze (1976, 1983). In 1987, in Espoo he shared 1st-3nd place in International Chess tournament.

Eero Raaste played for Finland in the Chess Olympiads:
 In 1974, at second reserve board in the 21st Chess Olympiad in Nice (+1, =3, -6),
 In 1976, at third board in the 22nd Chess Olympiad in Haifa (+1, =6, -2),
 In 1978, at first reserve board in the 23rd Chess Olympiad in Buenos Aires (+3, =3, -3),
 In 1982, at second reserve board in the 25th Chess Olympiad in Lucerne (+3, =1, -2),
 In 1986, at fourth board in the 27th Chess Olympiad in Dubai (+3, =1, -4).

Eero Raaste played for Finland in the European Team Chess Championships:
 In 1989, at fifth board in the 9th European Team Chess Championship in Haifa (+3, =1, -2).

Eero Raaste played for Finland in the World Student Team Chess Championships:
 In 1972, at second board in the 19th World Student Team Chess Championship in Graz (+1, =7, -6),
 In 1974, at second board in the 20th World Student Team Chess Championship in Teesside (+6, =0, -6).

Eero Raaste played for Finland in the Nordic Chess Cups:
 In 1971, at fifth board in the 2nd Nordic Chess Cup in Großenbrode (+1, =0, -4),
 In 1975, at third board in the 6th Nordic Chess Cup in Hindås (+3, =0, -2) and won team bronze medal,
 In 1977, at second board in the 8th Nordic Chess Cup in Glücksburg (+2, =1, -2).

Also Eero Raaste two times played for Finland in the Telechess Olympiads (1978, 1982).

In 1987, he was awarded the FIDE International Master (IM) title.

References

External links

Eero Raaste chess games at 365chess.com

1954 births
Living people
Finnish chess players
Chess International Masters
Chess Olympiad competitors